First English Lutheran Church may refer to:

 First English Lutheran Church (Syracuse, New York), listed on the NRHP in New York
 First English Lutheran Church (Mansfield, Ohio), listed on the NRHP in Ohio
 First English Lutheran Church (New Richmond, Wisconsin), listed on the NRHP in Wisconsin